List of compositions by Josef Suk.

References 

 
Suk, Josef, List of compositions by
Suk, Josef